Dzhe (Џ џ; italics: Џ џ) is a letter of the Cyrillic script used in Macedonian and varieties of Serbo-Croatian (Bosnian, Montenegrin, and Serbian) to represent the voiced postalveolar affricate , like the pronunciation of j in “jump”.

Dzhe corresponds in other Cyrillic alphabets to the digraphs дж or чж, or to the letters Che with descender (Ҷ ҷ), Che with vertical stroke (Ҹ ҹ), Khakassian Che (Ӌ ӌ), Zhe with breve (Ӂ ӂ), Zhe with diaeresis (Ӝ ӝ), or Zhje (Җ җ).

In the Latin version of Serbo-Croatian, it corresponds with the digraph dž which, like the digraphs lj and nj, is treated as a single letter, including in crossword puzzles and for purposes of collation.

Abkhaz uses it to represent the voiced retroflex affricate . The ligature џь is used to represent the  sound.

History
The letter Dzhe was first used in the 15th-century Romanian Cyrillic alphabet, as a modified form of the letter ч. Serbian scribes began using it in the 17th century. Vuk Karadžić included it in his Cyrillic script reform, when the letter entered widespread use.

Related letters and other similar characters
Dž : Digraph Dž
J j : Latin letter J
Ӂ ӂ : Cyrillic letter Ӂ
Ӝ ӝ : Cyrillic letter Ӝ
Җ җ : Cyrillic letter Җ
Ц ц : Cyrillic letter Ц
Ҷ ҷ : Cyrillic letter Ҷ

Ӌ ӌ : Cyrillic letter Ӌ
Ҹ ҹ : Cyrillic letter Ҹ

References

External links